Lassonde Industries Inc. is a Canadian agri-food company located in Rougemont and Montérégie, with operations throughout North America.

History 

Lassonde Industries Inc. acquired The Jim Pattison Group's indirect, wholly owned subsidiary Sun-Rype Products Ltd. for $80 million CAD, in an all cash deal expected to close before the end of the 2019 calendar year. As well, in announcing the purchase, it was reported that Sun-Rype had $164 million CAD in gross sales for their fiscal year ended September 30, 2019, and $9 million CAD in EBITDA.

Activities 

Lassonde Industries develops, produces, and markets a wide range of ready-to-drink fruit and vegetable juices and drinks. It also develops, produces, and markets specialized food products including fondue broths and sauces, soups, sauces, packaged corn on the cob, bruschetta toppings, tapenades, pestos, and pizza and pasta sauces. Finally, the company imports, packages, and markets wine from various countries, as well as apple cider and other wine-based beverages.

References

External links
 Lassonde Industries Inc. homepage

Companies listed on the Toronto Stock Exchange
Food and drink companies of Canada
Drink companies of Canada
Companies based in Quebec
Rouville Regional County Municipality
Food and drink companies established in 1918
1918 establishments in Quebec
Canadian companies established in 1918